Transmeridian Air Cargo  was a British cargo airline that operated from 1962 until 1979 when it merged with IAS Cargo Airlines to form British Cargo Airlines.

History
Transmeridian began operations under the name Trans Meridian Flying Service on 5 October 1962 and began operations on 1 November 1962 using a Douglas DC-4. The airline was then based at Liverpool and used the DC-4 for freight and passenger charters. A second DC-4 (both were ex-military Douglas C-54 Skymaster) was bought and freight services to Dublin and Paris–Le Bourget Airport were begun.

At the beginning of 1965 the DC-4s were replaced by Douglas DC-7C and a year later two more DC-7s were acquired. With the expansion in the fleet freight services to the Middle East and Africa were started. By the end of 1967 the company was taken over by Trans World Leasing and converted into a pure freight operation, with that the name was changed to Transmeridian Air Cargo.

In 1968 the Canadair CL-44 was introduced and eventually eight examples were incorporated the fleet, all being fitted with swinging rear fuselages to facilitate the loading of large items of cargo. It was during this period that the base of operations was moved to London Stansted Airport. Operations continued throughout the 1970s with 1975 being the year when a base was set up in Hong Kong for freight flights to Australia.

In 1977 the Trafalgar House Group bought 90% of Transmeridian and on 15 August 1979 merged it with IAS Cargo Airlines to form British Cargo Airlines, which later became HeavyLift Cargo.

Fleet

Douglas DC-3
Douglas DC-4 ex Douglas C-54 Skymaster
Douglas DC-7C Seven Seas
Short Belfast
Canadair CL-44D4-2
Canadair CL-44-O Guppy
Douglas DC-8-54F
Boeing 737-2B1(C)

Accidents and incidents
On 2 September 1977 G-ATZH a CL-44 on a non-scheduled cargo flight from Hong Kong to the United Kingdom crashed on departure from Hong Kong Airport. All four crew were killed. The cause was due to loss of control after the right out wing and Number 4 engine had separated from the aircraft following an engine fire.

See also
 List of defunct airlines of the United Kingdom

References

External links
 

Airlines established in 1962
Airlines disestablished in 1979
Defunct cargo airlines
Defunct charter airlines of the United Kingdom
Defunct companies based in Liverpool
Defunct companies based in London
1962 establishments in England
1979 disestablishments in England